Zikney Tzfat (or “Elders Of Safed” in Hebrew) is a grunge / punk band formed in Tel Aviv, Israel around 1990 by Maor Cohen, Yoni Ben Tovim, Oren Lutenberg and Adiel Portugaly who was later replaced by Rea Mochiach. They were known for their wild and chaotic concerts and their extreme lyrics which were full with absurdist and childish humour.

Description
In the period of their first album (simply titled Zikney Tzfat) their music was very noisy and influenced by American grunge bands like Killdozer and Butthole Surfers. Around 1994 the band members changed and the band released another album (Zikney Tzfat 2), which was softer and more melodic; as a result, it was more successful commercially (it sold gold) but musically was less appreciated by critics and fans. In 1995 they released two more albums (Ten Li Shlager and Ten Li Shlager 2) which were more "Low Fi" in their nature and were musically more reminiscent of the first album. The band split in 1996.

In March 2014 after a film that was made about Zikney Tzfat's early years (HaAlbomim, channel 8) brought them all together again, the four band members discovered that the spark and unique musical chemistry between them still exists. They spontaneously and surreptitiously went to the studio and recorded "Lo Hayu Dvarim Meolam", a mad hypnotic psychedelic new rock album with a rough uninhibited sound and approach - despite a twenty-year gap, it is a direct and logical follow-on from their original album.

Recent activities
Cohen continues to make music as a solo artist, Lutenberg is playing guitar with some of the leading musicians in Israel (Berry Sakharof amongst them), Mochiach was playing with Gogol Bordello and David Byrne amongst others and continues to make music and Bentovim is a film maker based in London. Other musicians who played in the band in various periods are: Tom Mochiach and Yuval Kiner and Aviv Pappo.

Discography
LPs all released by NMC:
Zikney Tzfat - 1992
Zikney Tzfat 2 - 1994
Ten Li Shlager - 1995
Ten Li Shlager 2 - 1996

LPs released by Anova Music:
Lo Hayu Dvarim Meolam - 2014

External links
פורטל המוזיקה הגדול של ישראל | mako מוזיקה (in Hebrew)
Wayback Machine

Israeli punk rock groups
Israeli alternative rock groups
Israeli heavy metal musical groups
Musical groups established in 1990